International Reserves of the Russian Federation are liquid assets held by the Russian Federation's central bank or other monetary authority in order to implement monetary policies relating to the country's currency exchange rate and ensuring the payment of its imports. The assets include foreign currency and foreign denominated bonds, gold reserves, SDRs (special drawing rights) and the IMF reserve position.

International reserves of the Russian Federation

Gold reserves of the Russian Federation

See also

 Foreign exchange reserves
 Gold reserve
 Foreign-exchange reserves of China
 Foreign-exchange reserves of India
 Gold reserves of the United Kingdom
 List of countries by foreign-exchange reserves
 List of countries by foreign-exchange reserves (excluding gold)
 List of countries by gold production

References

Gold
Gold standard